When The Tide Turns Again is a 1998 folk music album by Vin Garbutt. It is a reissue of the earlier album When The Tide Turns with one additional track (The Court of Cahirass).

Track listing
 Where the Hell are we Going to Live
 When the Tide Turns
 The Ballad of John Pearson
 Lady Anne Montgomery
 Nica Nicaragua
 The Court of Cahirass
 Absent Friends
 The Jolly Butchers/The London Lassies
 Carol Anne Kelly
 Not for the First Time
 I Wouldn't Have One Myself
 The Secret

1998 albums
Vin Garbutt albums
Reissue albums